Pardomima furcirenalis is a moth in the family Crambidae. It was described by George Hampson in 1918. It is found in the South African provinces of KwaZulu-Natal, Western Cape and Eastern Cape.

References

Endemic moths of South Africa
Moths described in 1918
Spilomelinae